The 1925–26 Rugby Union County Championship was the 33rd edition of England's premier rugby union club competition at the time.

Yorkshire won the competition for the eighth time (but first for thirty years) after defeating Hampshire in the final.

Final

See also
 English rugby union system
 Rugby union in England

References

Rugby Union County Championship
County Championship (rugby union) seasons